Thudaca mimodora is a moth of the family Depressariidae. It is found in Australia, where it has been recorded from New South Wales, Queensland, the Australian Capital Territory and Victoria.

The wingspan is about 20 mm. Adults have satin-white wings with two brown diagonal stripes and a brown border around each forewing.

The larvae feed on the new shoots of Leptospermum. They are green and live in a slight web. The pupa is attached to a leaf by a cremaster and sticks out. It is unprotected by a cocoon.

References

Moths described in 1893
Thudaca
Taxa named by Edward Meyrick